The Faculté de droit de l'Université Laval is the law school of Université Laval. Founded in 1852, it is one of the oldest institutions of its kind in North America. It hosts more than  students in its curriculum of first, second, and third years, with more than 45 lecturers teaching and supervising research projects in most areas of law. The research activity is particularly intense in the field of human rights and public freedoms in light of legal issues, economic law, environmental law, public law, and private international trade.

Teaching and research are based on a law library with more than  documents, which receives subscriptions of several hundred legal periodicals from Quebec, Canada, and internationally.

Specializations
The Laval Faculty of Law allows for specializations in:
 Public law
 Commercial law
 International law
 Corporate law
 Tax law
 Judicial law
 Criminal law
 Labour law

Programs of study 
 Certificate of Law
 Bachelor of Laws (LL. B.)
Doctor of Law
Master of Laws (LL. M.)
 LL. M. in Business Law
 LL. M. in Environmental Law, Sustainable Development and Food Security
 LL. M. in Fundamental Rights
 LL. M. in International and Transnational Law
Master of Notarial Law (LL. M.)

Alumni 
The Laval Law School has educated many prominent Canadians. Many alumni have distinguished themselves in English and French Canada, most notably, in the fields of the civil service, politics, the judiciary, and business.

Numerous public figures, including Prime Ministers of Canada, Premiers of Quebec, Supreme Court Justices, federal Cabinet Ministers, Senators, and Lieutenant-Governors attended the Laval Faculty of Law.

Supreme Court of Canada justices 
 Henri Elzéar Taschereau — Justice of the Supreme Court of Canada
 Sir Charles Fitzpatrick — Justice of the Supreme Court of Canada
 Arthur Cyrille Albert Malouin — Justice of the Supreme Court of Canada
 Lawrence Arthur Dumoulin Cannon — Justice of the Supreme Court of Canada
 Robert Taschereau — Justice of the Supreme Court of Canada
 Louis-Philippe Pigeon — Justice of the Supreme Court of Canada
 Yves Pratte — Justice of the Supreme Court of Canada
 Julien Chouinard — Justice of the Supreme Court of Canada
 Louis LeBel — Justice of the Supreme Court of Canada
 Claire L'Heureux-Dubé — Justice of the Supreme Court of Canada
 Suzanne Côté — Justice of the Supreme Court of Canada

Politicians 
 Louis St. Laurent — Prime Minister of Canada
 Brian Mulroney — Prime Minister of Canada
 Jean Chrétien — Prime Minister of Canada
 Pierre Duchesne — Lieutenant-Governor of Quebec
 Edmund James Flynn — Premier of Quebec 1896-1897
 Louis-Alexandre Taschereau — Premier of Quebec 1920-1936
 Jean Lesage — Premier of Quebec 1960-1966
 René Lévesque — (did not graduate) Premier of Quebec 1976-1985
 Lucien Bouchard — Premier of Quebec 1996-2001, Leader of the Bloc Québécois
 Michael Meighen — Senator
 Michael Fortier — Senator
 Raymond C. Setlakwe — Senator

Royalty 

 Jean, Grand Duke of Luxembourg, Monarch of Luxembourg from 1964 to 2000

Business 

 Conrad Black — former media magnate
 Peter White
 William John Jacques Demers

Entertainment 
 Ben Mulroney — television presenter

See also 
List of law schools in Canada

References

External links 
  

Laval
Université Laval
Faculté de droit de l'Université Laval